Germaine Beaulieu (born 1949 in Laval, Quebec) is a Canadian poet and novelist, who has lived in Montreal since 1966. It was in 1977 that she began writing. She wrote the novel Sortie d'elle (s) mutante and fourteen anthologies such as, Repères du silence (2013) and Miroir du levant (2011). She also has published a series of postcards that illustrate poems from her collection, De l'Absence à volonté (1996). Many of her texts have appeared in various journals like Exit, Arcade, L'Estuaire, and La Nouvelle Barre du jour. Although her work is primarily in French, some of her writings have been translated into English. Some of these writings have been published in the journal Dandelion. Germaine Beaulieu is also a psychologist.

Bibliography 

 Envoie ta foudre jusqu'à la mort, Abracadabra, poetry, Montreal, Québec, Canada, Pleine Lune editions, 1977, 96 pages
 Sortie d'elle (s) mutante, roman, Montreal, Quinze editions. 1980. "Réelles" collection.
 Archives distraites, poetry. Trois-Rivières, Quebec, Canada, Les Ecrits des Forges editions, 1984, 64 pages.
 Textures en textes, poetry, Montréal, Noroît editions, Montreal, Québec, Canada, 1986, 80 pages.
 Aires sans distance, Montréal, Noroît editions, Montreal, Québec Canada, 1988, 80 pages.
 Réelle distante, poetry, Trois-Rivières, Quebec, Canada, Les Ecrits des Forges editions. 1991, 88 pages.
 Voie lactée, poetry, Trois-Rivières,Québec, Canada, Les Ecrits des Forges editions. 1991, 64 pages.
 De L'Absence à volonté, poetry, Trois-Rivières, Québec, Canada Coédition : Les Écrits des Forges/proverbe editions(Paris). 1996, 140 pages.
 Série de douze cartes postales/ poèmes, Trois-Rivières, Québec, Canada, Éditions Les Écrits des Forges, 1996,
 Entre deux gorgées de mer, Trois-Rivières, Québec, Canada, Les Ecrits des Forges editions, 1998, 105 pages.
 Trois voix l'écho, Trois-Rivières, Québec, Canada, Les Ecrits des Forges editions, 2000, 96 pages.
 Ailleurs au même instant, Trois-Rivières, Québec, Canada, Les Ecrits des Forges editions, 2002, 108 pages.
 D'acier de parfum de chair, Trois-Rivières, Québec, Canada, Les Ecrits des Forges editions, 2005, 93 pages.
 Avant la fin le temps, Trois-Rivières, Québec, Canada, Les Ecrits des Forges editions, 2008, 92 pages.
 Miroir du levant, Trois-Rivières, Québec, Canada, Les Ecrits des Forges editions, 2011, 108 pages.
 Repères du silence, Montréal, L'Hexagone editions, 2013, 120 pages
 Matière crue, Trois-Rivieres, Quebec, Canada, Les Ecrits des Forges editions, 2016.

References 

Living people
Artists from Quebec
People from Laval, Quebec
Writers from Quebec
20th-century Canadian novelists
20th-century Canadian poets
20th-century Canadian artists
21st-century Canadian novelists
21st-century Canadian poets
21st-century Canadian artists
Canadian women novelists
Canadian women poets
Canadian women artists
Canadian novelists in French
Canadian poets in French
Canadian lesbian writers
French Quebecers
21st-century Canadian women writers
20th-century Canadian women writers
1949 births
21st-century Canadian LGBT people
20th-century Canadian LGBT people
Canadian lesbian artists